Elaea or Elaia was an ancient Greek city located in the foothills southwest of Sidon, Lebanon.

References
Richard Talbert, Barrington Atlas of the Greek and Roman World,, p. 69

Hellenistic colonies